Louis W. Riggs (born ) is an American politician who is a Republican member of the Missouri House of Representatives. He has represented the 5th House District since 2019. He is also a professor at Hannibal–LaGrange University.

Electoral history

State Representative

References

Living people
1961 births
Republican Party members of the Missouri House of Representatives
21st-century American politicians